NGC 2070 (also known as Caldwell 103) is a large open cluster and candidate super star cluster forming the heart of the bright region in the centre-south-east of the Large Magellanic Cloud. It is at the centre of the Tarantula Nebula and produces most of the energy that makes the latter's gas and dust visible. Its central condensation is the star cluster R136, one of the most energetic star clusters known. Among its stars are many of great dimension, including the second most massive star known, R136a1, at 215  and 6.16 million .

References

External links
 
 

2070
Tarantula Nebula
Dorado (constellation)
Open clusters
Large Magellanic Cloud
Star-forming regions